Citrinophila is a genus of butterflies in the family Lycaenidae. The genus is endemic to the Afrotropical realm.

Species
Citrinophila bennetti Jackson, 1967
Citrinophila erastus (Hewitson, 1866)
Citrinophila marginalis Kirby, 1887
Citrinophila similis (Kirby, 1887)
Citrinophila tenera (Kirby, 1887)
Citrinophila terias Joicey & Talbot, 1921
Citrinophila unipunctata Bethune-Baker, 1908

References

Poritiinae
Lycaenidae genera
Taxa named by William Forsell Kirby